Street Rap is a 12" single by New Zealand/hip-hop artist, Mareko which features Wu-Tang Clan member Inspectah Deck and was released in 2003.

Track listing
Side A 
"Street Rap" (Clean) ft. (Inspectah Deck)
"Street Rap" (Street) ft. (Inspectah Deck)
"Street Rap" (Instrumental)

Side B
"Don't Need Protection "(Clean) ft. (Scram Jones & Roc Raida)
"Don't Need Protection" (Street) ft. (Scram Jones & Roc Raida)
"Don't Need Protection" (Instrumental)

References 

Mareko EPs
2003 EPs
Dawn Raid Entertainment EPs